Scutellaria parvula, commonly known as the small skullcap, is a member of the mint family. It is native to eastern and central North America, being most common in the central states and become rare in the east. It is found in areas that provide ample sunlight, such as prairies, glades, and savannas, often in calcareous soil. Flowering time is from late spring to early summer.

The closely related Scutellaria australis is sometimes considered a variety of this species.

References

External links

parvula
Flora of Eastern Canada
Flora of the Eastern United States
Flora of the United States
Taxa named by André Michaux